The Logan County Courthouse, Eastern District is located at Courthouse Square in the center of Paris, one of two county seats for  Logan County, Arkansas.  It is a handsome two story Classical Revival building, built out of brick and set on a foundation of cut stone.  It has classical temple porticos on three sides, and is topped by an octagonal tower with clock and belfry.  It was built in 1908, and is one of the city's most architecturally imposing buildings.

The building was listed on the National Register of Historic Places in 1976.

See also
National Register of Historic Places listings in Logan County, Arkansas

References

Courthouses on the National Register of Historic Places in Arkansas
National Register of Historic Places in Logan County, Arkansas
Government buildings completed in 1908
Buildings and structures in Paris, Arkansas
1908 establishments in Arkansas
Logan